Humberto Jose Quintero (born August 2, 1979) is a Venezuelan former professional baseball player and coach. He played in Major League Baseball (MLB) as a catcher from 2003 to 2014 most prominently as a member of the Houston Astros. He also played for the San Diego Padres, Kansas City Royals, Philadelphia Phillies, and Seattle Mariners. He served as a bullpen catcher for the Arizona Diamondbacks from 2016 to 2021.

Playing career

Minor Leagues
On January 16, 1997, Quintero signed as an international free agent with the Chicago White Sox. After playing 2 years in Venezuela, he played 1999 with Advanced Rookie Bristol, where in 48 games, he hit .277 with 15 RBI and 11 SB. He spent most of 2000 with Single-A Burlington, but also played in 15 games for the Arizona League White Sox. In 90 games total, he hit .266 with 32 RBI and 11 SB. He split 2001 with Single-A Kannapolis and the A-Advanced Winston-Salem Warthogs, but also played in 5 games for Double-A Birmingham. In 108 games, he hit .254 with 1 HR, 34 RBI and 16 SB. After the year, he was rated the 25th best prospect in the White Sox organization by Baseball America.

On July 12, 2002, Quintero was traded with Alex Fernandez to the San Diego Padres for D'Angelo Jiménez. Before the trade, he played mostly with Winston-Salem, but also played in 4 games with Birmingham, and 15 games with Triple-A Charlotte. After the trade, he played with Double-A Mobile. In 108 games, he hit .225 with 1 home run and 34 RBI. Quintero played 2003 with Mobile, where he hit .298 with 3 HR and 52 RBI before being called up in September.

San Diego Padres
Quintero appeared in 12 games for the Padres in 2003, where he went 5-23 with 2 RBI. His first career hit came as a pinch-hitter in his debut, a single off of Dennys Reyes of the Arizona Diamondbacks. Quintero spent most of the 2004 with Triple-A Portland, but spent 3 stints with the Padres, including being the starting catcher for most of July. He hit his first career home run off of Scott Service. In 23 games with the Padres, he hit .250 with two home runs and 10 RBI.

Houston Astros

On March 28, 2005, Quintero was traded to the Houston Astros for pitcher Tim Redding. Quintero began the year with Triple-A Round Rock. On June 1, Quintero was recalled when Raúl Chávez was designated for assignment. He started 5 games before being placed on the disabled list. After a rehab assignment with Double-A Corpus Christi, he was activated from the disabled list on July 16. On August 31, he was optioned to Round Rock, but was recalled when the rosters expanded. In 18 games with the Astros, he hit .185 with 1 HR and 8 RBI.

Quintero spent most of 2006 with Round Rock, but on August 28, he was recalled, replacing J. R. House. In 11 games with the Astros, he went 7-21 with 2 RBI. Quintero made the Opening Day roster with the Astros in 2007, but was outrighted to Round Rock on June 10. He returned to the Astros as a September call-up. In 29 games with the Astros, he hit .226 with 1 RBI.

Quintero made the Opening Day roster in 2008 with the Astros, but did not appear in a game before being outrighted to Round Rock. On April 14, he was called up to the Astros, but was outrighted again on April 23. On June 5, he was called up again, replacing J. R. Towles. On July 2, he was placed on the disabled list with a concussion, and was activated on June 22 after a rehab assignment in Corpus Christi. He was the starting catcher for most of August and September, replacing Brad Ausmus.

Quintero was considered the incumbent starting catcher for the 2009 season due to his experience over J.R. Towles and Lou Palmisano but was used as a backup catcher after the team came to terms with Iván Rodríguez on March 16, 2009. He began 2009 with the Astros, but on April 25, he was placed on the disabled list. After a rehab assignment with Round Rock, he was activated from the disabled list on May 12. Quintero spent the rest of the season with the Astros. In 60 games with the Astros, he hit .236 with 4 HR and 14 RBI.

In the 2010 season, Quintero was moved into the starting role behind the plate and was backed up by Kevin Cash. He began splitting time with Jason Castro during the season. In 88 games, he hit .234 with 4 HR and 20 RBI.

On May 28, 2011, Quintero was placed on the 15-day disabled list with a high right ankle sprain. Robinson Cancel was called up to take his spot followed by Carlos Corporan just a few days later. In 79 games with the Astros, he hit .240 with two home runs and 25 RBI.

Kansas City Royals
On March 20, 2012, Quintero was traded to the Kansas City Royals along with Jason Bourgeois for minor leaguer Kevin Chapman and a player to be named later.

On June 27, Quintero was designated for assignment. He was released by Kansas City on July 5, after batting .232 with 1 HR and 19 RBI for the team in 43 games.

Miami Marlins
Quintero signed a minor league contract with the Miami Marlins on July 14, 2012, and was assigned to the Triple-A New Orleans Zephyrs. He was released on July 20, 2012.

Milwaukee Brewers
On July 28, 2012, Quintero signed a minor league contract with the Milwaukee Brewers. He was assigned to Triple-A Nashville.

Philadelphia Phillies
He was designated for assignment on April 28, 2013. He was called up to the Phillies when Carlos Ruiz was placed on the disabled list, and became the starting catcher for nine days when Erik Kratz was placed on the disabled list. However, with both catchers having returned from their injuries, Quintero was designated for assignment on June 24. After clearing waivers, Quintero elected free agency.

Seattle Mariners

On July 26, 2013, Quintero was signed by the Seattle Mariners. Quintero signed a minor league deal with the Seattle Mariners on January 6, 2014.

After spending the Triple-A season with the Mariners' affiliate the Tacoma Rainiers, Quintero was added to the active roster on 1 September 2014, when the rosters expanded.

Boston Red Sox
On January 21, 2015, Quintero signed a minor league deal with the Boston Red Sox. He elected free agency on November 6.

Toronto Blue Jays
On November 20, 2015, Quintero signed a minor league contract with the Toronto Blue Jays. He was released on April 18, 2016.

Detroit Tigers
On April 19, 2016, Quintero signed a minor league deal with the Detroit Tigers and was assigned to the Triple-A Toledo Mud Hens. He was released on May 24, 2016.

Coaching career

Arizona Diamondbacks
In June 2016, Quintero became the second bullpen catcher for the Arizona Diamondbacks.

See also

 List of players from Venezuela in Major League Baseball

References

External links

1979 births
Living people
Águilas del Zulia players
Arizona League White Sox players
Birmingham Barons players
Bristol White Sox players
Burlington Bees players
Charlotte Knights players
Corpus Christi Hooks players
Houston Astros players
Kannapolis Intimidators players
Kansas City Royals players
Lehigh Valley IronPigs players
Major League Baseball catchers
Major League Baseball players from Venezuela
Mobile BayBears players
Nashville Sounds players
New Orleans Zephyrs players
Oklahoma City RedHawks players
Pawtucket Red Sox players
Philadelphia Phillies players
Portland Beavers players
Round Rock Express players
San Diego Padres players
Seattle Mariners players
Sportspeople from Maracaibo
Tacoma Rainiers players
Toledo Mud Hens players
Venezuelan expatriate baseball players in the United States
Winston-Salem Warthogs players